East Setauket is a hamlet and census-designated place (CDP) on Long Island, in the town of Brookhaven, Suffolk County, New York, United States. It was first listed as a CDP prior to the 2020 census. Before that it was part of the Setauket-East Setauket CDP. It includes the hamlet of South Setauket. within the CDP.

The community is in northwestern Suffolk County, in the northwest part of the town of Brookhaven. The hamlet of East Setauket is at the northern edge of the CDP, at the head of Setauket Harbor, an arm of Long Island Sound. South Setauket is in the southwest part of the CDP, along Path Drive. The East Setauket CDP is bordered by Setauket to the northwest, Poquott to the north, Port Jefferson to the northeast, Port Jefferson Station to the east, Terryville to the southeast, Centereach to the south, Stony Brook to the southwest, and Stony Brook University to the west.

References 

Census-designated places in Suffolk County, New York
Census-designated places in New York (state)